Kein Mann zum Heiraten ("No Man to Marry") is a 1959 Austrian film directed by Hans Deppe.

Plot summary

Cast 
Hans-Joachim Kulenkampff as Wolf Kruse
Marianne Hold as Brigitte Voss
 as Renate Hammerschmidt
Friedl Czepa as Therese Hammerschmidt
Johanna König as Annaberta Frühling
Thomas Alder as Robert 'Bobby' Berger
Walter Gross as Baupolizist
Kurt Großkurth as Leo Hammerschmidt
Paul Hoffmann as Karl Kruse
Franz Muxeneder as Seppl
Beppo Brem as Xaver Kirchmeyer
Walter Buschhoff as Sizilianer
Herbert Kersten
Ernst Waldbrunn as Detektiv
Heide Alrun
Helmi Mareich
Else Rambausek

Ted Herold, Bill Ramsey, Jan Wennick and Kjeld Wennick appear uncredited.

Soundtrack 
Bill Ramsey - "Souvernirs, Souvenirs" (Music by Werner Scharfenberger, lyrics by Fini Büsch)
Jan Wennick and Kjeld Wennick - "Mach doch nicht immer soviel Wind" (Music by Werner Scharfenberger, lyrics by Fini Büsch)
Jan Wennick and Kjeld Wennick - "Banjo-Boy" (Music by Werner Scharfenberger, lyrics by Fini Büsch)
Ted Herold - "Carolin" (Music by Werner Scharfenberger, lyrics by Fini Büsch)

External links 

1959 films
Austrian comedy films
1950s German-language films
1959 comedy films
Films directed by Hans Deppe
Constantin Film films